Şafak Bekçileri is a 1963 Turkish drama film, directed by Halit Refiğ and starring Göksel Arsoy, Leyla Sayar, and Nilüfer Aydan.

References

External links
Şafak Bekçileri at the Internet Movie Database
Guardians of Dawn (1963)

1963 films
Turkish war drama films
1963 drama films
Turkish black-and-white films
Films directed by Halit Refiğ